Mairead inghean Eachainn, also known as Mairead nic Eachainn, was a consort of Alexander Stewart, Earl of Buchan (a man also known as the "Wolf of Badenoch"). She was the daughter of a man named Eachann, and probably the mother of several children, including Alexander's like-named son, Alexander Stewart, Earl of Mar.

Mairead and Alexander 

Mairead was the daughter of a man named Eachann. She is described by a papal letter as "a woman of the diocese of Ross". Although she was evidently a Gaelic-speaking Highlander, the identity and location of her family are otherwise unknown.

Mairead is known to have cohabited with Alexander Stewart, Earl of Buchan in the late 1380s and 1390s. Although Alexander was canonically married to Euphemia I, Countess of Ross, his contemporaneous union with Mairead appears to have been a Gaelic secular marriage. Alexander's relationship with Mairead was not unprecedented. His father, Robert II, King of Scotland, had similarly cohabited with Elizabeth Mure.

Alexander and Euphemia were married in 1382. By way of their union, Alexander gained control of the lands of Ross, and attained a jointure of Euphemia's lands outwith this earldom: Lewis, Skye, and Dingwall. Although he never gained the title Earl of Ross, Alexander was created Earl of Buchan by the king on account of Euphemia's inheritance. The childless marriage between Alexander and Euphemia was nevertheless a failure.

In 1389, Euphemia, brought a complaint before the bishops of Moray and Ross, declaring that her marriage was a sham because Alexander was cohabiting with Mairead. Alexander subsequently pledged to return to her as her husband, and promised not to use his men against her. There is reason to suspect that it was the prospect of losing his claim on Euphemia's territorial possessions that compelled Alexander to cave to Euphemia demands.

In 1392, Antipope Clement VII finally terminated the marriage because it had been "the cause of wars, plundering, arson, murders, and many other damages and scandals". As a result of this divorce, Euphemia's lordships and estates were restored to her.

Alexander had five bastard sons. Mairead was evidently the mother of several of Alexander's children, including his like-named son. If she was the mother of Alexander's sons Duncan and Robert—men who are otherwise recorded to have conducted raids in 1392—Alexander and Mairead must have been familiar with each other in the 1370s, at about the time Alexander first appears active in Badenoch.

Upon the conclusion of Alexander's marriage to Euphemia, Euphemia's son from an earlier marriage faced the prospect of losing his inheritance. The longstanding relationship between Mairead and Alexander, coupled with evidence of a sham marriage between him and Euphemia, could indicate that the latter union was a political maneuver orchestrated by Alexander's father. As such, this union could well have violated what was a preexisting marriage between Alexander and Mairead, the mother of his children.

Notes

Citations

References

Primary sources

Secondary sources 

 
 
 
 
 
 
 
 
 
 
 
 
 
 
 
 
 
 

14th-century Scottish people
14th-century Scottish women
Medieval Gaels from Scotland
People from Ross and Cromarty
Year of birth unknown
Year of death unknown